Callionymus rivatoni, the New Caledonian longtail dragonet, is a species of dragonet native to the Pacific Ocean around New Caledonia. The specific name honours the French zoologist Jacques Rivaton.

References

R
Fish described in 1983